Epipristis nelearia is a moth of the family Geometridae first described by Achille Guenée in 1858. It is found in China (Hainan, Guangxi), India, the north-eastern Himalaya, the Philippines, Malaysia, Indonesia and Australia.

The length of the forewings is 12–15 mm for both males and females. The wings are greyish green.

Subspecies
Epipristis nelearia nelearia
Epipristis nelearia accessa Prout, 1937

References

Pseudoterpnini
Moths described in 1858
Taxa named by Achille Guenée